Branden Bowen (born September 17, 1996) is an American football offensive tackle who is a free agent. He played college football at Ohio State and was signed as an undrafted free agent by the Carolina Panthers after the 2020 NFL Draft.

College career
Bowen was ranked as a threestar recruit by 247Sports.com coming out of high school. He committed to Ohio State on November 23, 2014. Bowen started six games during the 2017 season at right guard before breaking his leg, sidelining him for the rest of the 2017 season and the entire 2018 season. He won the starting right tackle job after returning before the 2019 season.

Professional career
Bowen signed with the Carolina Panthers as an undrafted free agent after the 2020 NFL Draft. Bowen was released as part of final roster cuts on September 5, 2020.

On February 17, 2021, Bowen was signed by the Arizona Cardinals. He was waived on August 24, 2021.

References

1996 births
Living people
People from Draper, Utah
Players of American football from Utah
American football offensive tackles
Ohio State University alumni
Ohio State Buckeyes football players
Carolina Panthers players
Arizona Cardinals players